Clarissa Harlowe Barton (December 25, 1821 – April 12, 1912) was an American nurse who founded the American Red Cross. She was a hospital nurse in the American Civil War, a teacher, and a patent clerk. Since nursing education was not then very formalized and she did not attend nursing school, she provided self-taught nursing care. Barton is noteworthy for doing humanitarian work and civil rights advocacy at a time before women had the right to vote. She was inducted into the National Women's Hall of Fame in 1973.

Early life
Clarissa Harlowe Barton was born on December 25, 1821, in North Oxford, Massachusetts, and was named after the titular character of Samuel Richardson's novel Clarissa. Her father was Captain Stephen Barton, a member of the local militia and a selectman (politician) who inspired his daughter with patriotism and a broad humanitarian interest. He was a soldier under the command of General Anthony Wayne in his crusade against the Indigenous in the northwest. He was also the leader of progressive thought in the Oxford village area. Barton's mother was Sarah Stone Barton.

When she was three years old, Barton was sent to school with her brother Stephen, where she excelled in reading and spelling. At school, she became close friends with Nancy Fitts; she is the only known friend Barton had as a child due to her extreme timidity.

When Barton was ten years old, she assigned herself the task of nursing her brother David back to health for two years after he fell from the roof of a barn and received a severe head injury. She learned how to distribute the prescribed medication to her brother, as well as how to place leeches on his body to bleed him (a standard treatment at the time). She continued to care for David long after doctors had given up. He made a full recovery.

Her parents tried to help cure her timidity by enrolling her to Colonel Stones High School, but their strategy turned out to be a catastrophe. Barton became more timid and depressed and would not eat. She was brought back home to regain her health.

Upon her return, her family relocated to help a family member; a paternal cousin of Clara's had died and left his wife with four children and a farm. The house that the Barton family was to live in needed to be painted and repaired. Clara was persistent in offering assistance, much to the gratitude of her family. After the work was done, she was at a loss because there wasn't anything else to help with, to not feel like a burden to her family.

She began to play with her boy cousins and to their surprise, she was good at keeping up with such activities as horseback riding. It wasn't until after she had injured herself that Clara's mother began to question her playing with the boys. Her mother decided she should focus on more ladylike skills. She invited one of Clara's girl cousins over to help develop her femininity. From her cousin, she gained proper social skills as well.

To assist Barton with overcoming her shyness, her parents persuaded her to become a schoolteacher.  She achieved her first teacher's certificate in 1839, at only 17 years old. This profession interested Barton greatly and helped motivate her; she ended up conducting an effective redistricting campaign that allowed the children of workers to receive an education. Successful projects such as this gave Barton the confidence needed when she demanded equal pay for teaching.

Early professional life

Barton became an educator in 1838 and served for 12 years in schools in Canada and West Georgia. Barton fared well as a teacher; she knew how to handle  children, particularly the boys since as a child she enjoyed her boy cousins' and brothers' company. She learned how to act like them, making it easier for her to relate to and control the boys in her care. After her mother's death in 1851, the family home closed down. Barton decided to further her education by pursuing writing and languages at the Clinton Liberal Institute in New York. In this college, she developed many friendships that broadened her point of view on many issues concurring at the time. The principal of the institute recognized her tremendous abilities and admired her work. This friendship lasted for many years, eventually turning into a romance. As a writer, her terminology was pristine and easy to understand. Her writings and bodies of work could instruct the local statesmen.

While teaching in Hightstown, Barton learned about the lack of public schools in Bordentown, the neighboring city. In 1852, she was contracted to open a free school in Bordentown, which was the first ever free school in New Jersey. She was successful, and after a year she had hired another woman to help teach over 600 people. Both women were making $250 a year. This accomplishment compelled the town to raise nearly $4,000 for a new school building. Once completed, though, Barton was replaced as principal by a man elected by the school board. They saw the position as head of a large institution to be unfitting for a woman. She was demoted to "female assistant" and worked in a harsh environment until she had a nervous breakdown along with other health ailments, and quit.

In 1855, she moved to Washington D.C. and began work as a clerk in the U.S. Patent Office; this was the first time a woman had received a substantial clerkship in the federal government and at a salary equal to a man's salary. For three years, she received much abuse and slander from male clerks. Subsequently, under political opposition to women working in government offices, her position was reduced to that of copyist, and in 1858, under the administration of James Buchanan, she was fired because of her "Black Republicanism". After the election of Abraham Lincoln, having lived with relatives and friends in Massachusetts for three years, she returned to the patent office in the autumn of 1861, now as temporary copyist, in the hope she could make way for more women in government service.

American Civil War

On April 19, 1861, the Baltimore Riot resulted in the first bloodshed of the American Civil War. The victims, members of the 6th Massachusetts Militia, were transported after the violence to the unfinished Capitol Building in Washington D.C., where Barton lived at the time. Wanting to serve her country, Barton went to the railroad station when the victims arrived and nursed 40 men. Barton provided crucial, personal assistance to the men in uniform, many of whom were wounded, hungry and without supplies other than what they carried on their backs. She personally took supplies to the building to help the soldiers.

Barton quickly recognized them, as she had grown up with some of them and even taught some. Barton, along with several other women, personally provided clothing, food, and supplies for the sick and wounded soldiers. She learned how to store and distribute medical supplies and offered emotional support to the soldiers by keeping their spirits high. She would read books to them, write letters to their families for them, talk to them, and support them.

It was on that day that she identified herself with army work and began her efforts towards collecting medical supplies for the Union soldiers. Prior to distributing provisions directly onto the battlefield and gaining further support, Barton used her own living quarters as a storeroom and distributed supplies with the help of a few friends in early 1862, despite opposition in the War Department and among field surgeons. Ladies' Aid Society helped in sending bandages, food, and clothing that would later be distributed during the Civil War.  In August 1862, Barton finally gained permission from Quartermaster Daniel Rucker to work on the front lines.  She gained support from other people who believed in her cause.  These people became her patrons, her most supportive being Senator Henry Wilson of Massachusetts.

After the First Battle of Bull Run, Barton placed an ad in a Massachusetts newspaper for supplies; the response was a profound influx of supplies. She worked to distribute stores, clean field hospitals, apply dressings, and serve food to wounded soldiers in close proximity to several battles, including Cedar Mountain, Second Bull Run, Antietam, and Fredericksburg. Barton helped both Union and Confederate soldiers. Supplies were not always readily available though. At the battle of Antietam, for example, Barton used corn-husks in place of bandages.

In 1863 she began a romantic relationship with an officer, Colonel John J. Elwell.

In 1864, she was appointed by Union General Benjamin Butler as the "lady in charge" of the hospitals at the front of the Army of the James. Among her more harrowing experiences was an incident in which a bullet tore through the sleeve of her dress without striking her and killed a man to whom she was tending. She was known as the "Florence Nightingale of America". She was also known as the "Angel of the Battlefield" after she came to the aid of the overwhelmed surgeon on duty following the battle of Cedar Mountain in Northern Virginia in August 1862.  She arrived at a field hospital at midnight with a large number of supplies to help the severely wounded soldiers. This naming came from her frequent timely assistance as she served troops at the battles of Fairfax Station, Chantilly, Harpers Ferry, South Mountain, Antietam, Fredericksburg, Charleston, Petersburg and Cold Harbor.

Postwar
After the end of the American Civil War, Barton discovered that thousands of letters from distraught relatives to the War Department were going unanswered because the soldiers they were asking about were buried in unmarked graves. Many of the soldiers were labeled as "missing." Motivated to do more about the situation, Miss Barton contacted President Lincoln in hopes that she would be allowed to respond officially to the unanswered inquiries. She was given permission, and "The Search for the Missing Men" commenced.

After the war, she ran the Office of Missing Soldiers, at 437 ½ Seventh Street, Northwest, Washington, D.C. in the Gallery Place neighborhood. The office's purpose was to find or identify soldiers killed or missing in action. Barton and her assistants wrote 41,855 replies to inquiries and helped locate more than 22,000 missing men. Barton spent the summer of 1865 helping find, identify, and properly bury 13,000 individuals who died in Andersonville prison camp, a Confederate prisoner-of-war camp in Georgia. She continued this task over the next four years, burying 20,000 more Union soldiers and marking their graves. Congress eventually appropriated $15,000 toward her project.

American Red Cross

Barton achieved widespread recognition by delivering lectures around the country about her war experiences in 1865–1868. During this time she met Susan B. Anthony and began an association with the woman's suffrage movement. She also became acquainted with Frederick Douglass and became an activist for civil rights.  After her countrywide tour she was both mentally and physically exhausted and under doctor's orders to go somewhere that would take her far from her current work. She closed the Missing Soldiers Office in 1868 and traveled to Europe. In 1869, during her trip to Geneva, Switzerland, Barton was introduced to the Red Cross and Dr. Appia; he later would invite her to be the representative for the American branch of the Red Cross and help her find financial benefactors for the start of the American Red Cross. She was also introduced to Henry Dunant's book A Memory of Solferino, which called for the formation of national societies to provide relief voluntarily on a neutral basis.

In the beginning of the Franco-Prussian War, in 1870, she assisted the Grand Duchess of Baden in the preparation of military hospitals and gave the Red Cross society much aid during the war. At the joint request of the German authorities and the Strasbourg Comité de Secours, she superintended the supplying of work to the poor of Strasbourg in 1871, after the Siege of Paris, and in 1871 had charge of the public distribution of supplies to the destitute people of Paris. At the close of the war, she received honorable decorations of the Golden Cross of Baden and the Prussian Iron Cross.

When Barton returned to the United States, she inaugurated a movement to gain recognition for the International Committee of the Red Cross (ICRC) by the United States government. In 1873, she began work on this project.  In 1878, she met with President Rutherford B. Hayes, who expressed the opinion of most Americans at that time which was the U.S. would never again face a calamity like the Civil War. Barton finally succeeded during the administration of President Chester Arthur, using the argument that the new American Red Cross could respond to crises other than war such as natural disasters like earthquakes, forest fires, and hurricanes.

Barton became President of the American branch of the society, which held its first official meeting at her I Street apartment in Washington, DC, May 21, 1881. The first local society was founded August 22, 1881 in Dansville, Livingston County, New York, where she maintained a country home.

The society's role changed with the advent of the Spanish–American War during which it aided refugees and prisoners of the civil war. Once the Spanish–American War was over the grateful people of Santiago built a statue in honor of Barton in the town square, which still stands there today. In the United States, Barton was praised in numerous newspapers and reported about Red Cross operations in person.

Domestically in 1884 she helped in the floods on the Ohio river, provided Texas with food and supplies during the famine of 1887, took workers to Illinois in 1888 after a tornado, and that same year took workers to Florida for the yellow fever epidemic. Within days after the Johnstown Flood in 1889, she led her delegation of 50 doctors and nurses in response, founding what would become Conemaugh Health System. In 1896, responding to the humanitarian crisis in the Ottoman Empire of the Hamidian massacres, Barton arrived in  Constantinople February 15. Barton along with Minister Terrell spoke with Tewfik Pasha, the Turkish Minister of Foreign Affairs, to procure the right to enter the interior.  Barton herself stayed in Constantinople to conduct the business of the expedition. Her General Field Agent, J. B. Hubbell, M.D.; two Special Field Agents, E. M. Wistar and C. K. Wood; and Ira Harris M. D., Physician in Charge of Medical Relief in Zeitoun and Marash, traveled to the Armenian provinces in the spring of 1896, providing relief and humanitarian aid to the Armenian population who were victims of the massacres done in 1894–1896 by Ottoman Empire. Barton also worked in hospitals in Cuba in 1898 at the age of 77. Barton's last field operation as President of the American Red Cross was helping victims of the Galveston hurricane in 1900. The operation established an orphanage for children.

As criticism arose of her mixing professional and personal resources, Barton was forced to resign as president of the American Red Cross in 1904 at the age of 83 because her egocentric leadership style fit poorly into the formal structure of an organizational charity. She had been forced out of office by a new generation of all-male scientific experts who reflected the realistic efficiency of the Progressive Era rather than her idealistic humanitarianism. In memory of the courageous women of the civil war, the Red Cross Headquarters was founded. During the dedication, not one person said a word. This was done in order to honor the women and their services. After resigning, Barton founded the National First Aid Society.

Final years
She continued to live in her Glen Echo, Maryland home which also served as the Red Cross Headquarters upon her arrival at the house in 1897. Barton published her autobiography in 1908, titled The Story of My Childhood. On April 12, 1912, she died in her home at the age of 90. The cause of death was pneumonia.

Religious beliefs
Although not formally a member of the Universalist Church of America, in a 1905 letter to the widow of Carl Norman Thrasher, she identified herself with her parents' church as a "Universalist".
My dear friend and sister:

Your belief that I am a Universalist is as correct as your greater belief that you are one yourself, a belief in which all who are privileged to possess it rejoice. In my case, it was a great gift, like St. Paul, I "was born free", and saved the pain of reaching it through years of struggle and doubt.

My father was a leader in the building of the church in which Hosea Ballow preached his first dedication sermon. Your historic records will show that the old Huguenot town of Oxford, Mass. erected one of, if not the first Universalist Church in America. In this town I was born; in this church I was reared. In all its reconstructions and remodelings I have taken a part, and I look anxiously for a time in the near future when the busy world will let me once more become a living part of its people, praising God for the advance in the liberal faith of the religions of the world today, so largely due to the teachings of this belief.

Give, I pray you, dear sister, my warmest congratulations to the members of your society. My best wishes for the success of your annual meeting, and accept my thanks most sincerely for having written me.

Fraternally yours, (Signed) Clara Barton. While she was not an active member of her parents' church, Barton wrote about how well known her family was in her hometown and how many relationships her father formed with others in their town through their church and religion.

Clara Barton National Historic Site

In 1975, the Clara Barton National Historic Site, located at 5801 Oxford Road, Glen Echo, Maryland, was established as a unit of the National Park Service at Barton's home, where she spent the last 15 years of her life. As the first National Historic Site dedicated to the accomplishments of a woman, it preserves the early history of the American Red Cross, since the home also served as an early headquarters of the organization.

The National Park Service restored eleven rooms, including the Red Cross offices, the parlors, and Barton's bedroom. Visitors to the house were able to gain a sense of how Barton lived and worked. Guides led tourists through the three levels, emphasizing Barton's use of her unusual home. In October 2015 the site was closed for repairs and remained closed, due to the COVID-19 pandemic, through 2021. The house reopened to the public in 2022, although the second and third floors of the house remain closed, due to "structural concerns".

The North Oxford, Massachusetts, house in which she was born is now also a museum.

Clara Barton's Missing Soldiers Office
In 1869, Barton closed the Missing Soldiers Office and headed to Europe. The third floor of her old boardinghouse was boarded up in 1913, and the site forgotten. The site was "lost" in part because Washington, DC realigned its addressing system in the 1870s. The boardinghouse became 437 ½ Seventh Street Northwest (formerly 488-1/2 Seventh Street West).

In 1997, General Services Administration carpenter Richard Lyons was hired to check out the building for its demolition. He found a treasure trove of Barton items in the attic, including signs, clothing, Civil War soldier's socks, an army tent, Civil War-era newspapers, and many documents relating to the Office of Missing Soldiers. This discovery led to the NPS saving the building from demolition. It took years, however, for the site to be restored. The Clara Barton's Missing Soldiers Office Museum, run by the National Museum of Civil War Medicine, opened in 2015.

Fictional depictions
 Numbering All the Bones by Ann Rinaldi features Barton and Andersonville Prison, a Civil War prison with terrible conditions.
 Angel of Mercy (MGM, 1939) is a biographical short film directed by Edward L. Cahn, starring Sara Haden as Barton and Ann Rutherford as a woman whose brother's death in a Civil War battle inspires her to join Barton in her work.
 In the NBC TV series Voyagers! (1982–1983), Phineas Bogg and Jeffrey Jones travel through time to make sure history proceeds correctly. In the episode "The Travels of Marco ... and Friends", season 1, episode 9, original airdate December 3, 1982, Phineas and Jeffrey rescue Barton (Patricia Donahue) from a burning wagon, but she is on the verge of succumbing to smoke inhalation. Jeffrey (a young boy from 1982) applies mouth-to-mouth resuscitation (a technique unknown in Barton's time) and saves her life, thus enabling her to go on to found the American Red Cross.
 Mandy Moore plays Barton in an episode of Drunk History which features a summary of Barton's accomplishments during and after the Civil War as narrated by Amber Ruffin.
 America: The Motion Picture features a highly fictionalized version of Clara Barton as voiced by Megan Leahy.
 In the HBO series The Gilded Age (2022), Barton is played by Tony Award-nominated actress Linda Emond.

Places named for Clara Barton

Schools
 Clara Barton Elementary School in Levittown, Pennsylvania
 Barton Hall at Montclair State University in Upper Montclair, New Jersey
 Clara Barton Elementary on Del Amo Boulevard in Long Beach, California
 Clara Barton Elementary School in Alton, Illinois
 Clara Barton Elementary School in Redmond, Washington
 Clara Barton Elementary School in Milwaukee, Wisconsin
 Clara Barton Elementary School in Anaheim, California
 Barton County Community College, Great Bend, Kansas
 Clara Barton Elementary School in The Bronx
 Clara Barton Elementary School in Cherry Hill, New Jersey
 Clara Barton Elementary School in Chicago
 Clara Barton Elementary School in Corona, California
 Clara Barton Elementary School in Oxford, Massachusetts
 Clara Barton Elementary School in San Diego (now San Diego Cooperative Charter School)
 Clara Barton Elementary School in Rochester NY
 Clara Barton Elementary School in West Mifflin, Pennsylvania
 Clara Barton Junior High School in Royal Oak, Michigan
 Clara Barton High School for Health Professions in Brooklyn
 Clara Barton House, a residence hall at Towson University, Towson, Maryland
 Clara Barton Open School in Minneapolis
 Clara Barton School, in Cabin John, Maryland, now the Clara Barton Community Center
 Clara Barton School in Bordentown, New Jersey
 Clara Barton School in Fargo, North Dakota
 Clara Barton School in Philadelphia
 Barton Academy in Mobile, Alabama

Streets
 Clara Barton Road in Oxford, Massachusetts
 Clara Barton Lane in Galveston, Texas
 Barton Boulevard in Rockledge, Florida
 Clara Barton Drive in Albany, New York
 Clara Barton Drive in Fairfax Station, Virginia
 Clara Barton Parkway in Maryland
 Clara Barton Street in Dansville, NY
 Clara Barton Boulevard in Garland, TX
 Clara Barton Circle in Sylacauga, AL
 Clara Bartonstraat in Amsterdam
 Barton Road in Windsor, Maine
 Clara Barton Road in Douglas County, Wisconsin
 Clara Barton Street, Sagua la Grande, Cuba

Other

 Barton, a crater on Venus
 Barton Center for Diabetes Education, North Oxford, Massachusetts
 Barton County, Kansas
 Barton Hall, Iowa State University
 Barton House in Towson University
 Barton Towers, in Royal Oak, Michigan, on the former site of Clara Barton Junior High School
 Barton's Crossing, Pittsfield, Massachusetts, a homeless shelter
 Clara Barton, a Norwegian Air Boeing 737-8MAX (part of Norwegian's "Tailfin Heroes" series)
 Clara Barton, New Jersey, an unincorporated community located within Edison Township
 Clara Barton Auditorium, United States Patent and Trademark Office, Alexandria, Virginia
 Clara Barton Community Center, Cabin John, Maryland
 Clara Barton District, a regional association of Unitarian Universalist Association member congregations
 Clara Barton First Aid Squad, Edison, New Jersey
 Clara Barton Home and Gardens, Johnstown, PA
 Clara Barton Hospital and Clinics, Hoisington, Kansas
 Clara Barton Memorial Forest in Lake Clear, New York, planted in 1925
 Clara Barton Post Office Building, at 14 Walnut Street in Bordentown, New Jersey
 Clara Barton Service Area, on the New Jersey Turnpike in Oldmans Township, New Jersey
 Clara Barton Shelter, Stony Brook State Park, Dansville, New York
 Clara Barton Tree, a giant sequoia tree in the Giant Forest, Sequoia National Park
 Heritage of Clara Barton, Edison, NJ, an Assisted Living Community
 Lake Barton in Burke, Virginia
 The House of Clara Barton at The King's College (New York City)

Other remembrances

A stamp with a portrait of Barton and an image of the American Red Cross symbol was issued in 1948.

Barton was inducted into the National Women's Hall of Fame in 1973.

Barton was featured in 1995 in a set of U.S. stamps commemorating the Civil War.

In 2019, Barton was announced as one of the members of the inaugural class of the Government Executive magazine's Government Hall of Fame.

Exhibits in the east wing of the third floor, 3 East, of the National Museum of American History are focused on the United States at war. The Clara Barton Red Cross ambulance was at one point the signature artifact there but is no longer on display.

The school in the Disney show Sydney to the Max is named Clara Barton Middle School.

Clara Barton was inducted into the New Jersey Hall of Fame in 2008.

Published works
 Barton, Clara H. The Red Cross – In Peace and War. Washington, D.C.: American Historical Press, 1898.  .
 Barton, Clara H. Story of the Red Cross – Glimpses of Field Work. New York: D. Appleton and Company, 1904.  .
 Barton, Clara H. The Story of My Childhood. New York: Baker & Taylor Company, 1907.  Reprinted by Arno Press in 1980.  .

References

Further reading
 Barton, William E. The Life of Clara Barton Founder of the American Red Cross. (1922) .
 Burton, David Henry. Clara Barton: in the service of humanity (Greenwood, 1995); Major scholarly study online
 Crompton, Samuel Etinde. Clara Barton: Humanitarian. New York: Chelsea House, 2009. . .
 Deady, Kathleen W. Clara Barton. Mankato: Capstone Press, 2003. . .
 Dulles Foster R. The American Red Cross: A History (1950)
 Henle, Ellen Langenheim. "Clara Barton, Soldier or Pacifist?." Civil War History 24.2 (1978): 152–160. online
 Hutchinson, John F. Champions of Charity: War and the Rise of the Red Cross. Boulder: Westview Press, Inc., 1996.  .
 Jones, Marian Moser. The American Red Cross from Clara Barton to the New Deal. Baltimore: Johns Hopkins University Press, 2013.  
 Joyce, James Avery. Red Cross International and the Strategy of Peace. New York: Oceana Publications, Inc., 1959. .
 Oates, Stephen B. A Woman of Valor: Clara Barton and the Civil War. New York: Free Press, 1994.  
 Ross, Ishbel. Angel of the Battlefield: The Life of Clara Barton. New York: Harper and Brothers Publishers, 1956. .
 Safranski, Debby Burnett. Angel of Andersonville, Prince of Tahiti: The Extraordinary Life of Dorence Atwater. Alling-Porterfield Publishing House, 2008.   
 
 Barton, Report of Miss Clara 1896, Report, America's Relief Expedition to Asia Minor Under the Red Cross. Journal Publishing Company, Meriden, Conn.

Historiography
 Amico, Eleanor B., ed.  Reader's Guide to Women's Studies ( Fitzroy Dearborn, 1998) pp. 56–57

External links

 Clara Barton, Civil War Nurse, Educator And Humanitarian
 Clara Barton Elementary School – Lake Washington School District
 Clara Barton National Historic Site
 Clara Barton Birthplace Museum
 Clara Barton Missing Soldiers Office
 The Barton Center For Diabetes Education, Inc.
 Clara Barton Passport Application – 1869 (Original document image)
 Clara Barton, A Register of Her Papers in the Library of Congress
 Clara Barton Papers at the Sophia Smith Collection, Smith College Special Collections
 Michals, Debra.  "Clara Barton".  National Women's History Museum.  2015.
 The personal papers of Clara Barton are in the Harvard Divinity School Library at Harvard Divinity School in Cambridge, Massachusetts.
 
 
 
 
 Portrait of Clara Barton on ICRC Library and Archives blog CROSS-files
 Clara Barton papers at the University of Maryland Libraries

 
1821 births
1912 deaths
19th-century Christian universalists
20th-century Christian universalists
American Red Cross personnel
American humanitarians
American nurses
American women nurses
Burials in Massachusetts
Female wartime nurses
Women humanitarians
Patent examiners
People from Bordentown, New Jersey
People from Glen Echo, Maryland
People from Oxford, Massachusetts
People of Massachusetts in the American Civil War
People of the Franco-Prussian War
Recipients of the Iron Cross (1870)
Hall of Fame for Great Americans inductees
American women writers
American Christian universalists
American founders
Women founders
American Civil War nurses
Deaths from pneumonia in Maryland